Parliamentary elections were held in the United Arab Republic (now Egypt) on 10 March 1964, with a second round on 19 March. At the time the country was a one-party state and all candidates had to be members of the Arab Socialist Union (ASU). A total of 1,750 candidates contested the 350 elected seats. A further ten members were appointed by President Gamal Abdel Nasser.

Results

References

United Arab
Parliamentary election
Elections in the United Arab Republic
One-party elections
United Arab Republic parliamentary election
Election and referendum articles with incomplete results